Plasmodium pinotti is a parasite of the genus Plasmodium subgenus Giovannolaia.

Like all Plasmodium species P. pinotti has both vertebrate and insect hosts. The vertebrate hosts for this parasite are birds.

Description 
The parasite was first described by Muniz and Soares in 1954. It was named after Mario Pinotti.

Geographical occurrence 
This species is found in Jamaica.

Clinical features and host pathology 
Known hosts of this species include the bananaquit (Coereba flaveola), orangequit (Euneornis campestris), yellow-shouldered grassquit (Loxipasser anoxanthus), large toucan (Ramphastos toco) and black-faced grassquit (Tiaris bicolor).

References 

pinotti
Parasites of birds